Fatima is a surname. People with the surname are as follows:

 Altaf Fatima (1927–2018), Indian Urdu-language novelist
 Batool Fatima (born 1982), Pakistani cricketer
 Djoumbé Fatima (1837–1878), 19th-century queen of the sultanate of Mohéli
  Ghulam Fatima , known as Miss Fatima (1912– c. 1990), British-Indian chess master
 Ghulam Fatima (born 1995), Pakistani cricketer 
 Maryam Fatima (born 1997), Pakistani model
 Rabab Fatima, Bangladeshi diplomat
 Sharifa Fatima (15th century), Yemeni Zaydi chief

See also
 Fatima (disambiguation)
 Fatima (given name)